The Doctor's Building is a six-story commercial building in Nashville, Tennessee that was constructed in 1916 (some sources say 1910) and is listed on the National Register of Historic Places.

The building site was the former location of the home of railroad magnate Colonel Edmund William Cole, with his home being the last 19th-century mansion on Church Street. A new building, known as "The Doctor's Building" was then constructed as a three-story building, with medical offices on the upper floors, and retail shops on the ground floor. The design, by architect Edward Emmett Dougherty of the architectural firm "Dougherty and Gardner" was of the elaborate Beaux-Arts or Renaissance Revival style. The exterior is sheathed with glazed polychrome terra cotta.

In the 1940s and 1950s, the building consisted of office space for many of the city's doctors and dentists.

References

Commercial buildings on the National Register of Historic Places in Tennessee
Renaissance Revival architecture in Tennessee
Buildings and structures in Nashville, Tennessee
National Register of Historic Places in Nashville, Tennessee
Commercial buildings completed in 1910